The New Haven-Weybridge Rattling Bridge is a historic bridge spanning Otter Creek between the Vermont towns of Weybridge and New Haven.  It connects Town Highway 7 (Pearson Road) in New Haven with Town Highway 11 (Morgan Horse Farm Road) in Weybridge.  Built in 1908 by the American Bridge Company, it is a well-preserved example of a rivet-connected lattice truss bridge.  It was listed on the National Register of Historic Places as Bridge 26 in 2006.

Description and history
The New Haven-Weybridge Rattling Bridge is located in southwestern New Haven and northeastern Weybridge, where the town border is defined by Otter Creek. It is oriented north-south, and crosses the river just east of the Huntington Falls dam. It is a single-span metal truss, in a style sometimes called a double-intersection Warren truss, but in a style more similar to that of a Whipple truss. The structural elements of the trusses are joined by rivets. The bridge derives its name from loosely laid deck boards, which rattled when they were driven on.

The bridge was built in 1908 by the American Bridge Company, as part of a program begun in 1892 by the state to improve its transport infrastructure.  The road which it carries was originally the Waltham Pike, opened in 1808, which was the first road to traverse the town of Weybridge.  Construction of the bridge was principally funded by the town of Weybridge; it is now co-owned and maintained by the two towns.

See also
 
 
 
 
 National Register of Historic Places listings in Addison County, Vermont
 List of bridges on the National Register of Historic Places in Vermont

References

Bridges on the National Register of Historic Places in Vermont
National Register of Historic Places in Addison County, Vermont
Bridges completed in 1908
Bridges in Addison County, Vermont
Buildings and structures in Weybridge, Vermont
Buildings and structures in New Haven, Vermont
1908 establishments in Vermont
Metal bridges in the United States
Lattice truss bridges in the United States
Road bridges in Vermont